The Shire of Chinchilla was a local government area in the Darling Downs region of Queensland, Australia.

The economy of the area is largely reliant on primary production. Agriculture is the mainstay of the community, with beef and pork production, wool growing, and horticulture traditionally underwriting the local economy.

History
The Shire of Chinchilla was established on 12 January 1912 by severance from the Shire of Wambo.

On 15 March 2008, under the Local Government (Reform Implementation) Act 2007 passed by the Parliament of Queensland on 10 August 2007, the Shire of Chinchilla merged with the Town of Dalby and the Shires of Murilla, Tara and Wambo and the southern part of Taroom to form the Western Downs Region.

Towns and localities
The Shire of Chinchilla included the following settlements:

Towns:
 Chinchilla
 Brigalow
 Kogan

Localities:
 Barakula
 Boonarga
 Brigalow
 Burncluith
 Burra Burri
 Canaga
 Goombi
 Hopeland
 Pelican
 Rywung
 Wychie

Chairmen and Mayors

Population

References

External links
 Queensland Places: Chinchilla Shire

Former local government areas of Queensland
Darling Downs
2008 disestablishments in Australia
Populated places disestablished in 2008